John Kurila  (10 April 1941 – 6 March 2018) was a Scottish footballer, who played as a wing half in The Football League.

Career
John was born in Scotland of Lithuanian parentage. He was raised in the Gorbals area of Glasgow, Scotland. Kurila most notably played for Northampton Town, as well as playing for Celtic, Bristol City, Southend United, Colchester United and Lincoln City. He also spent two summers in Canada playing for Hamilton Steelers of the Eastern Canada Professional Soccer League.
  
Kurila settled in the Northampton area after football — he had two separate spells with the Cobblers — and worked in the building trade, notably as a qualified carpenter. He was married to Nan Carr, also from Glasgow, and had three children - a daughter Keely, and two sons, Mick and Alan, who both became footballers at non-League level. Kurila died in March 2018 at the age of 76.

Honours

Club
Northampton Town
 Football League Second Division Runner-up (1): 1964–65
 Football League Third Division Winner (1): 1962–63

References

External links
 
 John Kurila at Colchester United Archive Database

1941 births
2018 deaths
Association football wing halves
Bristol City F.C. players
Celtic F.C. players
Colchester United F.C. players
English Football League players
Lincoln City F.C. players
Northampton Town F.C. players
Scottish Football League players
Scottish footballers
Scottish people of Lithuanian descent
Southend United F.C. players
Footballers from Glasgow
People from Gorbals
Hamilton Steelers (ECPSL) players
Eastern Canada Professional Soccer League players